The Walking Drum is a novel by the American author Louis L'Amour. Unlike most of his other novels, The Walking Drum is not set in the frontier era of the American West, but rather is an historical novel set in the Middle Ages—12th-century Europe and the Middle East.

Plot summary

Forced to flee his birthplace on the windswept coast of Brittany to escape the Baron de Tournemine, who killed his mother, and to seek his lost father, Mathurin Kerbouchard looks for passage on a ship and, although forced to serve as a galley slave initially, travels the coast and attains the position of pilot, frees a captured Moorish girl, Aziza, and her companion, then frees his fellow slaves and with their help sells his captors into slavery and escapes to Cádiz in Moorish Spain, where he looks for news of his father.

Hearing that his father is dead, Mathurin goes inland and poses as a scholar in Córdoba, but his scholarship is interrupted when he becomes involved in political intrigue surrounding Aziza and is imprisoned by Prince Ahmed.  Scheduled to be executed, Mathurin escapes eastward to the hills outside the city, but before he leaves soldiers arrive and ransack and burn the place where he is staying, leaving him for dead.  Mathurin returns to Córdoba and, aided by a woman he chances upon named Safia, he takes a job as a translator.  However, the intrigue in which she is involved threatens their lives, and they must flee the city.  Safia, through connections of her own, has gathered news of Mathurin's father, and tells him that his father may be alive but was sold as a slave in the east.

Leaving Spain, they take up with a merchant caravan and travel by land across Europe, stopping along the way at various places to trade or to fight off thieves.  Reaching Brittany, the caravan tempts a raid from the Baron de Tournemine, but they are ready for his attack and, routing his forces, press on, joined by another caravan, to sack the baron's castle.  Mathurin personally kills his enemy, avenging his mother, and, leaving the caravan, takes Tournamine's body and throws it into a fabled swamp rumored to be a gate to Purgatory.

Riding eastward, Mathurin befriends a group of oppressed peasants before rejoining the caravan as it approaches Paris.  Safia has learned that Mathurin's father is at Alamut, the fortress of the Old Man of the Mountain (Assassin), but warns that going there is dangerous.  She leaves the caravan and remains in Paris, but Mathurin must go on and seek his father.  Both caravans will travel eastward and cross the Russian steppes together.

In Paris, Mathurin talks with a group of students but offends a teacher and must flee again for his life.  Chancing upon the fleeing Comtesse de Malcrais, Suzanne, whom he assists in escaping from Count Robert.  They meet up with the caravans again at Provins, where they are joined by a company of acrobats (including Khatib) and additional caravans from Italy, Armenia, the Baltic, Venice, and the Netherlands.  The caravans join together and travel to Kiev to trade their woolen cloaks and other goods for furs.  Denied passage down the Dnieper by boat, the caravans head southward from Kiev.  Crossing the Southern Bug and approaching the Chicheklaya, they encounter hostile Pechenegs.  Stalling for time as the caravan drives south toward the Black Sea, Kerbouchard exchanges pleasantries with the Khan, fights a duel with Prince Yury, and receives a drink, but as he leaves the camp the Khan warns him that the Petchenegs will attack the caravan in the morning.

Kerbouchard returns to the caravan, which has nearly reached the Black Sea, and assists as they contrive rudimentary fortifications, hoping to hold their ground against the Petchenegs until boats arrive to take them to Constantinople.  A protracted battle ensues, by the end of which most of the caravan merchants are killed, but Suzanne may have escaped in a small boat, and Mathurin, wounded, hides in the brush and nurses himself gradually back to health, barely surviving to emerge, reclaim his horse, and ride to Byzantium by land, clothed in rags.

Casting out Abdullah, a fat storyteller, and taking his place in the market in Constantinople, Mathurin makes a couple of gold coins and an enemy named Bardas.  Leaving the market with a man named Phillip, he spends the coins on clothing.  In a wine shop, he meets Andronicus Comnenus and captures his interest.  Perceiving that rare books are valuable in the city, Mathurin then takes to copying from memory books that he copied in Córdoba.  Contacting Safia's informant, he learns that his father is indeed at Alamut, but that he attempted to escape and may be dead.  Nevertheless, he is determined to go and find out.  Going to an armorer who maintains a room for exercising with weapons, he meets some of the Emperor's guard and drops hints to one of them of the books he is copying, so that the emperor will hear of him.  Invited to meet the emperor, Mathurin offers him advice and a book and tells the Emperor of his desire to rescue his father from Alamut.

Two weeks later, the emperor supplies Mathurin with a sword, three horses he had lost when the caravan was taken, and gold.  Invited to dinner with Andronicus, Mathurin learns from him that Suzanne has returned safely to her castle and strengthened its defenses with survivors from the caravan.  Bardas makes trouble, and Mathurin and Phillip must leave the party, but Mathurin has a vision and foretells Andronicus' death.  Mathurin advises Phillip to leave the city and go to Saône, and he himself receives a warning note from Safia, telling him not to go to Alamut.

Leaving Constantinople, Mathurin travels by boat across the Black Sea to Trebizond and adopts the identity of ibn-Ibrahim, a Muslim physician and scholar, travelling over land to Tabriz, where he finds Khatib, who tells him rumors that his father is being treated terribly by a powerful newcomer to Alamut named al-Zawila.  Invited to visit the Emir Ma'sud Kahn, Mathurin presents a picture of himself in his identity as ibn-Ibrahim, physician, scholar, and alchemist, and, learning that ibn-Haram is in the city, decides to pass on from Tabriz toward Jundi Shapur, the medical school that provides his pretense for travelling through the area.

Leaving Tabriz, Mathurin and Khatib travel alongside a caravan as far as Qazvin, where ibn-Ibrahim receives gifts and an invitation to visit Alamut.  Before he leaves for Alamut, Mathurin makes the acquaintance of the princess Sundari, from Anhilwara, and, learning that she is being forced to marry a friend of the king of Kannauj, promises, if he escapes Alamut alive, to come to Hind and rescue her from this fate.

Traveling with Khatib to a valley outside Alamut, where they arrange to meet again afterward, Mathurin packs rope,  nitre crystals, and other ingredients from a Chinese recipe he had seen in a book in Córdoba, and gathers also various medicinal herbs, before riding up to the gates of Alamut.  He is admitted but immediately taken captive and brought before Mahmoud, who reveals that he ran into trouble with Prince Ahmed, and that the prince and Aziza are both dead.  According to Mahmoud, Sinan does not know that Mathurin has been brought to Alamut.

Locked in his quarters, Kerbouchard finds the rope has been removed from his pack.  Unable to escape, he speaks out his window to a guard, hoping that Sinan's spies will report his presence, and that Sinan will want to meet with an alchemist and physician such as himself.  The next morning, after mixing the saltpeter, charcoal, and sulfur from his saddlebags, repacking the resulting powder, and mixing several preparations from the herbs, he is confronted by Mahmoud and provokes him.  Brought before Sinan, Mathurin reveals to him some of the details of his past that Mahmoud had kept secret and broaches the subject of alchemy, hoping to be kept around a little longer.  Promising to see him later, Sinan sends him back to his quarters and also sends a copy of a book he had requested of Ma'sud Kahn in Tabriz.

Mathurin does get to see Sinan for most of a day, performing alchemy experiments and exchanging ideas.  Afterward, Mahmoud comes for him with armed guards and escorts him (along with his bags, which contains his surgery equipment) to a surgical room, telling him that he has been brought to Alamut on an errand of mercy to save a slave's life, by making him a eunuch.  The slave is his father.  Pretending to cooperate, Mathurin covertly cuts his father's bonds with a scalpel then, spilling boiling water on some of the guards, draws his sword and engages the remaining guards.  Other soldiers, presumably those of Sinan, break into the room, and Mathurin and his father escape down the corridor and through an aqueduct into the hidden valley.

In the garden among some spare pipes, Mathurin packs his prepared powder into pipes, plugs the ends, and fashions wicks from fat-soaked string, and they hide there until the middle of the next day.  Meeting a young girl in the rain, Mathurin trusts her with the gist of his situation and asks if there is any way out.  She tells of a gate whereby the gardener, closely guarded, takes out the leaves he rakes up, and, eager to escape, she agrees to meet them near the gate.  Soldiers searching the garden pass by their hiding place, and that evening they rush the gate and, assisted by a handful of slaves who are present, slay the guards, but the gate is closed on them.  Placing his prepared pipe bombs, Mathurin lights the fuses and, as soldiers approach, tells everyone to stand back.  With the gate destroyed and the soldiers stunned by his blast, they escape out and down the side of the mountain.  Slaying another dozen soldiers, Mathurin and his father, with the girl in tow, meet Khatib with the horses and ride off.

Reaching the city where Khatib had been hiding, they are confronted by Mahmoud and another dozen soldiers.  Mathurin fights a quick duel with Mahmoud and kills him.

At the end of the book, the girl from the valley, whose home was near the gulf, rides toward Basra with Mathurin's father, who will seek the sea again.  Mathurin rides toward Hind, to fulfill his promise to Sundari.

Characters
Mathurin Kerbouchard – main character
Jean Kerbouchard – also known as Kerbouchard the Corsair; Mathurin's father
Baron de Tournemine – a local enemy in Brittany
Taillefeur – lieutenant of the Baron de Tournemine; previously sailed with Jean Kerbouchard
Walther – captain of the ship that takes Kerbouchard south to Spain
Cervon – a Gaul; member of Walther's crew
Eric of Finnveden – a member of Walther's crew
Red Mark – rowing slave; companion of Mathurin on the trip south to Spain
Selim – Moorish rowing slave on the trip south to Spain
Aziza – wealthy Moorish girl captured from a merchant ship off the Spanish coast
Count Redwan – Aziza's Norman companion
Hisham ibn-Bashar – important Moor in Málaga, a friend of Redwan
ibn-Haram – military commander in Spain; enemy of Redwan and Aziza, supporter of Yusuf.
Duban – soldier in the service of Prince Ahmed; Mathurin first meets him in Málaga
Abu-Abdallah – a friend of Caliph Yusuf
Shir Ali – beggar in Cádiz who poses as a merchant
Ben Salom – Jewish merchant in Cádiz who buys Walther's ship and cargo
Abaka Khan – Mongol Mathurin befriends in Cádiz
John of Seville – famous scholar and translator whose life Mathurin saves on the road to Córdoba
Hassan – John's Bedouin travelling companion
ibn-Tuwais – Mathurin's host in Córdoba
Valaba – woman of influence in Córdoba, whom Mathurin meets in a coffee house
Sharasa – A girl from a valley whom Mathurin meets after escaping imprisonment
ibn-Rushd – also known as Averroës, noted scholar of Valaba's acquaintance
Mahmoud al-Zawila – Berber friend Mathurin makes in Córdoba; later, Sinan's right hand
Haroun el-Zegri – friend of Mahmoud and later of Mathurin
Prince Ahmed – Almoravid to whom Aziza is to be wedded, to cement an alliance with William of Sicily
Akim, his daughter Sharasa, nephew Alan, and son Aric – Mathurin's Visigoth hosts in the hills east of Córdoba
Safia – woman who helps Mathurin upon his return to Córdoba
Khatib – acrobat from Córdoba
Ya'kub – eldest and favourite son of Yusuf
Ayesha – horse given to Mathurin by Safia
Rupert von Gilderstern – Hansgraf (leader) of the merchant caravan
Other caravan members:  Lucca (from Lombardy), Johannes (an orphan from Bruges), Guido (from Piedmont)
Peter von Gilderstern – Rupert's brother, leader of the second caravan
Jacques, Paul – two of the peasants Mathurin assists
Julot – student Mathurin meets in Paris
Comtesse (Suzanne) de Malcrais – woman Mathurin and Julot meet near Paris, holder of the crusader castle Saône
Persigny – man who helps Mathurin and the Comtesse escape
Count Robert – man who wants to marry the Comtesse and becomes an enemy of Kerbouchard
Lolyngton – chief of the acrobats and performers who join the caravans at Provins
Yuri Olgevichi – a prince in Kiev, with some connections in the surrounding area
Flandrin, Sarzeau, Grossefeldt – leaders of some of the other caravans
Abdullah – story teller in Constantinople
Bardas – friend of Andronicus Comnenus
Andronicus Comnenus – cousin of Emperor Manuel I
Manuel I – Byzantine ruler in Constantinople
Phillip – son of a Macedonian mercenary; Mathurin meets him in Constantinople
Ordric – Viking guard of Emperor Manuel I; he practices with Mathurin
Mas'ud Khan – an emir in Tabriz and a spy for Sinan
Rashid Ad-din Sinan – the Old Man of the Mountain at Alamut
Sundari Devi – half Rajput, half Persian princess from Anhilwara, whom Mathurin meets in Qazvin
Rachendra – Rajput guard of Sundari Devi
Abdul – gate guard at Alamut
Zubadiyah – girl in the Valley of the Assassins

Analysis
The protagonist is Mathurin Kerbouchard of Brittany.  In the course of the story he travels from place to place, ultimately in search of his disappeared father. Along the way, he finds himself in the roles of slave, pirate, scholar, physician, merchant, alchemist, and yet always a lover.  Kerbouchard is a romantic seeker of knowledge and fortune on a challenging journey, full of danger, excitement, adventure, and revenge.

Along his long journey the main character is thrust into the heart of the treacheries, passions, violence and dazzling wonders of a magnificent time. From castle to slave galley, from sword-wracked battlefields to a princess's secret chamber, and ultimately, to the impregnable fortress of the Valley of the Assassins in the heart of Persia.

The book is named for a merchant caravan's marching drum, first described in chapter 36:  "We often sang as we marched, and there was always the sound of the walking drum, a sound I shall hear all my life, so deeply is it embedded in the fibers of my being..."  The book is filled throughout with this theme of travel to faraway lands, as epitomized by the marching of merchant caravans of the time.

Planned sequels
Following the end of the novel, Louis L'Amour wrote in the section titled "Author's Note", "I am planning to continue Kerbouchard's tale in at least two more adventures during the next few years, the first of which will follow Kerbouchard to Hind (India) in search of Sundari." This sequel was to be titled A Woman Worth Having. Book Three of the series was to be set in China. Despite L'Amour's stated desire, neither continuation of this novel was ever published, presumably due to his declining health, which eventually led to his death four years later, in 1988.

Release details
1985, US, Bantam Books, hardback (First edition)
1985, US, Bantam Books, paperback
1999, US, Bantam Books, paperback
1984, US, Bantam Books, hardback

See also

Last of the Breed, one of the author's other novels outside the western genre.

References 

1985 American novels
Novels by Louis L'Amour
Novels set in the 12th century
Novels set in the Byzantine Empire